Lick Run is a  long 1st order tributary to Sewickley Creek in Westmoreland County, Pennsylvania.

Variant names
According to the Geographic Names Information System, it has also been known historically as:
Hull Run

Course
Lick Run rise at Mendon, Pennsylvania, and then flows north to join Sewickley Creek at Yukon.

Watershed
Lick Run drains  of area, receives about 40.5 in/year of precipitation, has a wetness index of 342.83, and is about 70% forested.

References

 
Tributaries of the Ohio River
Rivers of Pennsylvania
Rivers of Westmoreland County, Pennsylvania
Allegheny Plateau